Wyoming Valley West School District is a large, suburban public school district in Luzerne County, Pennsylvania. Students from nine boroughs attend Wyoming Valley West: Courtdale, Edwardsville, Forty Fort, Larksville, Luzerne, Plymouth, Pringle, Kingston, and Swoyersville. Wyoming Valley West School District encompasses approximately 14 square miles. According to 2000 federal census data, it serves a resident population of 44,510. In 2009, the residents' per capita income was $17,532 while the median family income was $40,398. The median income of a home owner was $38,252 per year.

The district operates seven schools, including Wyoming Valley West Senior High School, the Wyoming Valley West Middle School and five elementary schools: Chester Street Elementary School, Dana Street Elementary Center,  State Street Elementary Center, Schuyler Avenue Elementary School, and Third Avenue Elementary School.
The District Administration (2009–2010)

Students within the school district may elect to attend the West Side Career and Technology Center (formerly West Side Area Vocational Technical School). The Career Center, located in Pringle, offers 18 unique technical programs that not only prepare students for future employment but also prepare those among them who would like to go on to college.

References

External links
 publicschoolsreport.com
 city-data.com
 publicschoolreview.com
  

School districts in Luzerne County, Pennsylvania